This article lists all power stations in Mali.

Hydroelectric

See also 
 List of power stations in Africa
 List of largest power stations in the world

Mali
 
Power stations